Leptodactylus camaquara is a species of frogs in the family Leptodactylidae.

It is endemic to Brazil.
Its natural habitats are moist savanna, subtropical or tropical moist shrubland, swamps, intermittent freshwater marshes, and pastureland.
It is threatened by habitat loss.

References

camaquara
Endemic fauna of Brazil
Amphibians described in 1978
Taxonomy articles created by Polbot